Dudley Alexander Sydney Cosby, 1st Baron Sydney (c. 1730 – 22 January 1774), was an Irish politician and diplomat.

Background
Cosby was the son of Pole Cosby, of Stradbally, Queen's County, and Mary, daughter of Henry Dodwell. Dudley Cosby was his grandfather.

Political and diplomatic career
Cosby was elected to the Irish House of Commons as one of two representatives for Carrick in 1763, a seat he held until 1768. In 1763 he was also appointed Minister Resident to Denmark, where he was to assist the aged Envoy Extraordinary, Walter Titley. He arrived in Copenhagen in February 1764, but returned to Britain already the following year. In 1768 he was elevated to the Peerage of Ireland as Lord Sydney, of Leix, Baron Stradbally.

Family
Lord Sydney married Lady Isabella, daughter of Thomas St Lawrence, 1st Earl of Howth and Isabella King,  in December 1773. He died  in January the following year, when the barony became extinct. Lady Sydney died in October 1836.

References

1730 births
1774 deaths
Barons in the Peerage of Ireland
Peers of Ireland created by George III
Ambassadors of Great Britain to Denmark
Members of the Parliament of Ireland (pre-1801) for County Leitrim constituencies
Irish MPs 1761–1768